"Manhattan" is a popular song and part of the Great American Songbook.  It has been performed by the Supremes, Lee Wiley, Oscar Peterson, Blossom Dearie, Tony Martin, Dinah Washington, Ella Fitzgerald and Mel Torme, among many others. It is often known as "We'll Have Manhattan" based on the opening line.  The music was written by Richard Rodgers and the lyrics by Lorenz Hart for the 1925 revue Garrick Gaieties. It was introduced by Sterling Holloway (later the voice of the animated Winnie the Pooh) and June Cochran.

In 1925, Richard Rodgers and Lorenz Hart had been song-writing partners for six years but only sold one song to be put in a Broadway show, "Any Old Place with You," that was bought by former vaudeville performer, now a producer, Lew Fields. On August 26, 1919, he inserted it into his current musical, A Lonely Romeo, at the Casino Theater. (Inserting new songs into running musicals was a common practice at that period.)

Since then, they had not sold another. They continued writing but were only able to donate songs to a long list of amateur or benefit shows. Rodgers was so discouraged he briefly considered going into a business when they got an offer from the prestigious Theater Guild to contribute all the songs for a two–performance benefit musical review on Sunday, May 17, 1925. Called Garrick Gaieties, it was to raise money for curtains for the Theater Guild's new theater. Given the Theater Guild’s reputation, they accepted. Rodgers also conducted the eleven member orchestra.

Halfway through the matinee's second act, Holloway and Cochran performed Manhattan in front of a plain curtain. It stopped the show. They sang two encores, using all the lyrics they had. Rodgers and Hart knew they had a hit, but there was only one more scheduled performance. They convinced the Guild to present matinees during the next week, before the evening performances of the Guild's current production. When these performances were all standing–room only, Rodgers convinced the Guild to close its current production and replace it with Garrick Gaieties. It ran for 211 performances with both getting $50 a week in royalties and Rodgers an additional $83 a week for conducting. Within a year they had three shows on Broadway simultaneously.

Lyrics and story
The song describes, in several choruses, the simple delights of Manhattan for a young couple in love. The joke is that these "delights" are really some of the worst, or cheapest, sights that New York has to offer; for example, the stifling, humid stench of the subway in summertime is described as "balmy breezes", while the noisy, grating pushcarts on Mott Street are "gently gliding by".  A particular Hart delight is the use of New York dialect to rhyme "spoil" with "boy and goil".

In the first stanza, the couple is obviously too poor to afford a honeymoon to the popular summertime destinations of "Niag'ra" or "other places", so they claim to be happy to "save our fares". In the second stanza, they go for a walk down Delancey Street, which was in the 1920s a boisterous commercial strip, part of the working-class Lower East Side.  In the third stanza, they plan to go to Greenwich Village, to watch "Modern men itch to be free".  In the fourth stanza, it is revealed that the only rural retreat they can afford to go to is "Yonkers", and the only restaurant they can afford is to "starve together in Childs'" a restaurant chain serving inexpensive meals, popular with middle- and working-class people. In later stanzas, other places they will go to are likewise free Central Park, "the Bronx Zoo", Coney Island, Brighton Beach, and to view the much-criticized statue of "Civic Virtue".

Versions
Since its debut, it has regularly appeared in popular culture.  Early hits in 1925 were by Ben Selvin and Paul Whiteman. It was first heard on film in the 1929 short Makers Of Melody, a tribute to Rodgers and Hart sung by Ruth Tester and Allan Gould.  Since then, it has been used in the Rodgers and Hart biopic Words And Music (1948), Two Tickets To Broadway (1951), Don't Bother To Knock (1952) (sung by Anne Bancroft), Beau James (1957), Silent Movie (1976), Tempest (1982), Mighty Aphrodite (1995), The English Patient (1996), Kissing Jessica Stein (2001) and many other movies and TV shows, most recently in the 2007 AMC production Mad Men episode "New Amsterdam". In the film All About Eve (1950), the song is played on the piano at the party when Margo and Max are in the kitchen.

As times progress, the song's reference to whatever long-running show is popular on Broadway changes with each cover version.  The original lyrics reference Abie's Irish Rose, which ran on Broadway from 1922 to 1927.  The Ella Fitzgerald rendition from 1956 mentions My Fair Lady, as does Dinah Washington's 1959 recording, while Lee Wiley and Rosemary Clooney reference South Pacific.
  
In the early and mid-1950s, singer Julius La Rosa became a national celebrity for his exposure on several of the shows hosted by one of the most popular television stars of the era, Arthur Godfrey. On October 19, 1953, La Rosa sang "Manhattan" on one of Godfrey's radio shows. Immediately after he finished, Godfrey fired him on the air, saying, "that was Julie's swan song with us", although the song had nothing to do with the firing. On another CBS radio program, the crime drama Broadway Is My Beat, its closing theme was a version of "Manhattan" played piano-bar style.

Crazy Otto released a version of the song on his 1958 EP Crazy Otto International, Vol. 2. as part of medley with the songs "Dungaree Doll" and "I Wonder Who's Kissing Her Now".

For many years during the 1960s and 1970s, radio station WABC-AM used the notes from the "We'll turn Manhattan" lyric and used it as the basis for their jingles.
The jingles were changed (specifically, the second note) around 1976 so that WABC would no longer be required to pay royalties for use of the melody.

Notable recordings
Lee Wiley recorded the song in December 1950 for her album Night in Manhattan
Tony Martin performed the song in the 1951 film Two Tickets to Broadway
Harry James recorded a version in 1952 on the album Soft Lights, Sweet Trumpet (Columbia CL 6207).
Bing Crosby recorded the song in 1956 for use on his radio show and it was subsequently included in the box set The Bing Crosby CBS Radio Recordings (1954-56) issued by Mosaic Records (catalog MD7-245) in 2009. 
Ella Fitzgerald included this on the Verve 1956 release Ella Fitzgerald Sings the Rodgers and Hart Songbook
Blossom Dearie recorded the song for her 1959 album Once Upon A Summertime
Dinah Washington recorded the song for her 1959 album What a Diff'rence a Day Makes!
Mickey Rooney performed the song in the film Words and Music
Jan & Dean recorded the song for their 1963 album Surf City And Other Swinging Cities
The Supremes recorded the song for their 1967 album The Supremes Sing Rodgers & Hart
Tony Bennett recorded a version in 1973 on the album Tony Bennett Sings 10 Rodgers & Hart Songs and another in his 1998 album As Time Goes By
Rod Stewart and Bette Midler – Stardust: The Great American Songbook Volume III (2004)
Caetano Veloso recorded the song for his 2004 album of covers, A Foreign Sound
Stan Freberg uses the line "You'll have Manhattan, the Bronx, and Staten Island too" as the setup for a joke about paying royalties, in "The Sale of Manhattan" on his 1961 album "Stan Freberg Presents The United States of America, Volume 1."

References

Songs with music by Richard Rodgers
Songs with lyrics by Lorenz Hart
Ella Fitzgerald songs
Bette Midler songs
Jan and Dean songs
1925 songs
1925 singles
Songs about New York City
Pop standards